Florensky is a lunar impact crater that is attached to the northeastern rim of the larger crater Vernadskiy. It is located on the far side of the Moon and cannot be directly seen from the Earth. The rim of this crater has been heavily eroded and it forms an irregular ring about the uneven interior. This crater was previously identified as Vernadskiy B before being assigned a name by the IAU in 1985.

References

 
 
 
 
 
 
 
 
 
 
 
 

Impact craters on the Moon